Thomas McKenzie (1906 – 1990) was a Scottish professional footballer who played as a right or left half, featuring solely at senior level for Motherwell. In his first season with the club, 1931–32, they were Scottish league champions, but McKenzie was a reserve and only made one appearance. His importance grew from then on, and he played in two of the club's Scottish Cup finals in the era, both of which were lost (1933 to Celtic, 1939 to Clyde).

He played twice for the Scottish Football League XI, and was selected for a Scottish Football Association tour of North America in 1939, but never received a full cap for Scotland.

After his playing career ended he was employed as a coach at Motherwell for several years, as was his younger brother Willie. Their nephews Billy and Sammy Reid were both footballers who also played for Motherwell.

References

1906 births
1990 deaths
Association football wing halves
Scottish footballers
Scottish Football League players
Scottish Football League representative players
Cambuslang Rangers F.C. players
Motherwell F.C. players
Motherwell F.C. non-playing staff
Sportspeople from Wishaw
Scottish Junior Football Association players
Footballers from North Lanarkshire